Clyde High School is a public high school located in Clyde, Texas, United States and classified as a 3A school by the UIL. It is part of the Clyde Consolidated Independent School District located in central Callahan County. In 2015, the school was rated "Met Standard" by the Texas Education Agency.

Athletics
The Clyde Bulldogs compete in these sports - 

Baseball
Basketball
Cross country
Football
Golf
Powerlifting
Softball
Tennis
Track and field
Volleyball
Wrestling

State titles
Girls Cross Country - 
1979(B)
Boys Track - 
1951(B)
Girls Track - 
1980(2A)
One Act Play - 
1963(1A), 1982(3A), 1983(3A)

Controversy
On December 5, 2020 an openly gay male student was given in-school-suspension for wearing nail polish, subsequently sparking widespread criticism, with many calling the school's dress code policies sexist and homophobic.

References

External links
School website

Public high schools in Texas
Schools in Callahan County, Texas